Riverwood is an unincorporated community in Noblesville Township, Hamilton County, Indiana. It was likely named from the nearby White River.

Geography

References

Unincorporated communities in Hamilton County, Indiana
Unincorporated communities in Indiana
Indianapolis metropolitan area